Cucamonga Peak is one of the highest peaks of the San Gabriel Mountains in San Bernardino County, California, with a summit elevation of . It is within the Cucamonga Wilderness of the San Bernardino National Forest.

It is named after the 19th-century Mexican land grant, Rancho Cucamonga, that was below it.

Geography
The mountain towers over the Inland Empire cities of Rancho Cucamonga, Ontario and Fontana.

The summit can be seen west of Cajon Pass on Interstate 15, the route from Southern California to Las Vegas. The peak can also be seen on extremely clear days from Mount San Jacinto  to the southeast, Irvine  to the south, and Santa Monica to the far west.

Recreation
The most popular trail to the summit begins in Icehouse Canyon. A Forest Service trail (7W07) leads from here to Icehouse Saddle, from which the Cucamonga Peak Trail (7W04) leads to the summit. A wilderness permit for vehicles is required.

It is advisable to bring a warm jacket or windbreaker as there is no protection from the elements when getting close towards the summit. Snow can also be found in certain parts of the hike depending on the season.

See also 

Rancho Cucamonga name — for theories of the word Cucamonga's origin.

References

External links 
 

Mountains of San Bernardino County, California
San Gabriel Mountains
San Bernardino National Forest
Mountains of Southern California